Salem is a Dispersed Rural Community and unincorporated place in the municipality of South Bruce, Bruce County in southwestern Ontario, Canada.

References

Communities in Bruce County